Tara is a small village, about 25 km south west of Choma, in the Southern Province of Zambia. It is situated along the main road from Livingstone to Lusaka. The main economic activity is farming with tobacco being the main cash crop. 

Populated places in Southern Province, Zambia